The  was a trainer built by Mitsubishi which was used by the Imperial Japanese Navy in an extremely wide variety of roles, including light transport, liaison aircraft, utility aircraft and occasionally light bomber. Its Allied reporting name was Pine.

Design & Development
The Mitsubishi K3M was designed by British aeronautical engineer and aircraft designer Herbert Smith, from Sopwith working in Japan for Mitsubishi. The prototype, designated Mitsubishi 4MS1, made its maiden flight in 1930. The aircraft was strut-braced high-wing cabin monoplane, with fixed wide-track landing gear, and was powered by a single  water-cooled radial piston engine. Pilot and gunner were located in separate open cockpits, with an instructor and two pupils in the enclosed cabin in the fuselage. Later passenger variants seated five passengers in the cabin.

Total production of all versions was around 625 aircraft, with production mostly undertaken by Kyushu Hikoki K.K. and Aichi Kokuki. Production continued until 1941, and examples pressed into service as liaison aircraft in the postwar period were found in a variety of national markings.

Operational history
The first version of the K3M offered to the Imperial Japanese Navy Air Service was prone to stability problems, and more importantly, problems with the water-cooled  Mitsubishi-built Hispano-Suiza 8A eight-cylinder liquid-cooled engine.

The first K3M2 production examples entered service in 1932 as the Navy Type 90 Crew Trainer. It was superseded in production with the K3M3, using a Nakajima Kotobuki  air-cooled engine.

The Navy Type 90 Crew Trainer was primarily a land-based aircraft although a few were fitted with floats.

The Imperial Japanese Army Air Force had an interest in the aircraft as part of its modernization program, and as a potential supplement to the Nakajima Ki-6. Two examples were acquired and tested, and the airframe was given the designation of Ki-7. One prototype used a  Mitsubishi Type 92 nine-cylinder air-cooled radial engine and the other a  Nakajima Kotobuki nine-cylinder air-cooled radial engine. The IJAAF did not order either version into production.

The civil version was offered to commercial operators with a  Nakajima-built Bristol Jupiter VI nine-cylinder air-cooled radial engine. The Mitsubishi K3M was used for both civil and military roles and some remained in operation until well after World War II.

Variants
Mitsubishi K3M1
 Initial version
Mitsubishi K3M2 (Japanese Navy Type 90 Crew Training Aircraft)
 Initial production version for Imperial Japanese Navy
Mitsubishi K3M3 (Japanese Navy Type 90 Crew Training Aircraft)
 Final production version for Imperial Japanese Navy
 Mitsubishi K3M3-L
 Military transport used by Imperial Japanese Navy 
Ki-7
 Version for Imperial Japanese Army, 2 built
Mitsubishi MS-1
 Civil transport version

Operators

Military operators

 Imperial Japanese Navy Air Service

Specifications (K3M3)

References
Notes

Bibliography

External links

Combined Fleet.com site

K03M, Mitsubishi
K03M
High-wing aircraft
Single-engined tractor aircraft